Centreville was a city in St. Clair County, Illinois, United States. The population was 5,309 in 2010, down from 5,951 at the 2000 census. On May 6, 2021, the city ceased to exist, being incorporated into the new city of Cahokia Heights.

Geography
Centreville was located at  (38.584583, -90.103768).

Demographics

As of the census of 2000, there were 5,951 people, 2,125 households, and 1,476 families residing in the city. The racial makeup of the city was 95.46% African American, 3.38% white, 0.13% Native American, 0.02% Pacific Islander, 0.13% from other races, and 0.87% from two or more races. Hispanic or Latino of any race were 0.57% of the population.

There were 2,125 households, out of which 34.8% had children under the age of 18 living with them, 27.5% were married couples living together, 35.2% had a female householder with no husband present, and 30.5% were non-families. 26.8% of all households were made up of individuals, and 11.8% had someone living alone who was 65 years of age or older. The average household size was 2.80 and the average family size was 3.38.

In the city, the population was spread out, with 33.5% under the age of 18, 9.2% from 18 to 24, 23.9% from 25 to 44, 20.1% from 45 to 64, and 13.2% who were 65 years of age or older. The median age was 31 years. For every 100 females, there were 85.3 males. For every 100 females age 18 and over, there were 77.2 males.

The median income for a household in the city was $23,500, and the median income for a family was $27,310. Males had a median income of $32,024 versus $23,528 for females. The per capita income for the city was $11,150. About 28.7% of families and 34.4% of the population were below the poverty line, including 48.4% of those under age 18 and 14.6% of those age 65 or over.

Notable people 

 Edward Burch, alternative country musician
 John Dettmer, pitcher for the Texas Rangers
 Byron Gettis, outfielder for the Kansas City Royals
 Jordan Goodwin, professional basketball player for the Washington Wizards
 Cedric Harmon, executive director, speaker, writer, and activist
 Reginald Hudlin, film director

Education
Some of the city was served by Cahokia Unit School District 187. Lalumier K-8 School is located in Centreville. Centerville K-8 is located in an unincorporated area near Centreville.

Some of the city was served by East St. Louis School District 189. Brown Elementary School is located in Centreville.

Poverty 
Centreville was the poorest city in the state of Illinois, as well as one of the poorest cities in the nation. The town median household income was $17,441, while the typical home in the area is worth approximately $47,900. The city was located on a Mississippi River floodplain known as American Bottom, and experiences chronic flooding and raw sewage disposal problems due to the area's inadequate system of drainage ditches, levees and emergency pumps.

References

Former municipalities in Illinois
Former populated places in Illinois
Populated places disestablished in 2021
Cities in St. Clair County, Illinois